Waddoups is a surname. Notable people with the surname include:

Clark Waddoups (born 1946), American judge
Michael G. Waddoups (born 1948), American politician and property manager